Lancaster and Wyre was a parliamentary constituency represented in the House of Commons of the Parliament of the United Kingdom. From 1997 to 2010, it elected one Member of Parliament (MP) by the first past the post system of election, but has now been replaced by Lancaster and Fleetwood.

History
This seat was created for the 1997 general election and was abolished at the 2010 general election. It was a marginal seat between the Labour and Conservative parties throughout its existence, and was the only seat gained by the Conservatives in the North West in the 2005 general election.

Boundaries	

The City of Lancaster wards of Bulk, Castle, Caton, Ellel, John O'Gaunt, Scotforth East, and Scotforth West, and the Borough of Wyre wards of Breck, Brock, Calder, Carleton, Catterall, Duchy, Garstang, Hambleton, Hardhorn, High Cross, Norcross, Pilling, Preesall, Staina, Tithebarn, and Wyresdale.

The Boundary Commission for England's proposals for parliamentary constituencies in Lancashire were completed in 2006. They proposed to split this seat into two. As a result, Lancaster was attached to another part of Wyre borough, over the River Wyre to the fishing port of Fleetwood. The new seat of Lancaster and Fleetwood represents the first time the two places have been linked for parliamentary reasons for many years.

The other seat is the new Wyre and Preston North. This seat has never been created before, and the bringing together of Garstang, Thornton, Poulton-le-Fylde and the Fulwood and northern rural areas of Preston is unprecedented.

Members of Parliament

There were only two Members of Parliament for this seat. Ben Wallace was selected to represent the Conservatives at the 2010 election in the successor seat of Wyre and Preston North.

Elections

Elections in to 2000s

Elections in the 1990s

See also
 List of parliamentary constituencies in Lancashire

Notes and references

Constituencies of the Parliament of the United Kingdom established in 1997
Constituencies of the Parliament of the United Kingdom disestablished in 2010
Politics of Lancaster
Politics of Wyre
Parliamentary constituencies in North West England (historic)